The Dead Kultuk ( Ölıqoltyq) is a bay of the Caspian Sea in the coast of Kazakhstan, west of the Ustyurt desert. 

The bay was known as 'Tsesarevich Bay' and then as 'Komsomolets Bay' in the past. Durneva Island lies near the entrance to the Dead Kultuk.

It had a distinct coastline in former times, but since the 1990s, with higher Caspian Sea levels, the water penetrates inland through the neck of the bay producing waterlogged marshes. Located at the mainland end of the bay, the Kaydak Inlet cuts deep into the coast extending east and then southwards. Nowadays both the bay and the inlet are filled with Caspian Sea water. Currently there are oil fields in the area.

Cartography
Owing to its special colour the Dead Kultuk is the bay which appears in early maps of the Caspian Sea as 'Blue Sea' ( in maps in that language). The area was mapped by Fedor Ivanovich Soimonov during the Caspian Expedition, which surveyed the Caspian Sea from 1719 to 1727, but was not accurately described until G. S. Karelin did so in 1832.

See also
Buzachi Peninsula
Dunga oil field

References

External links
Caspian Sea Biodiversity
Overview of oil and natural gas in the Caspian Sea region Last Updated: August 26, 2013
Earth As Art 3: A Landsat Perspective

Bodies of water of Kazakhstan
Bays of the Caspian Sea
Bays of Europe
Bays of Asia

kk:Өліқолтық